Radius Dilworth is a two-tower apartment development under construction in the Dilworth neighborhood of Charlotte, North Carolina in the United States.

History
In March 2006 State Street Co announced that 615 East Morehead would be developed into a 34-story luxury condo building. The company stated that it will be a "luxurious residential high-rise".  State Street purchased the 1.5-acre site in 2002 from the Charlotte Housing Authority for $1.9 million.

The condo project was put on hold due to the recession of the 2000s.  The 1.5-acre site plus a 1.4-acre parking was listed by JLL in August 2019.  At that time the asking price was not disclosed.  However, according to most recent Mecklenburg land reevaluation the 1.5-acre site was valued at $4 million and the 1.4 acre site had a value of $3.2 million.  In December 2020, Spandrel Development Partners purchased the two parcels totaling 2.8 acre site at 615 E Morehead for $17.8 million.

The site will consist of two towers: an eight-story building of 274 apartment and a 26-story building containing 350 apartments. The two buildings will feature  of space. They will have  of amenities which will include a fitness center, pool, and co-working space.

The Overlook building will have  of ground retail space, enough for at least two retailers.  Emanuel Neuman, Spandrel partner said, businesses like coffee shops or restaurants would be a natural fit for the neighborhood. The building will also have a 13-story parking deck with seven stories wrapped around the building.  A skybridge will connect the two building so that the parking deck is easily to both buildings.

This is Spandrel Development's first project in Charlotte.  The company's second project is an apartment development near Camp North End.  The developer acquired the 19 acres for $4.4 million in September 2022 which is located at 3245 Statesville Ave.  It will be a multifamily development composed of 350 apartments
Spandrel specifically chose Charlotte because of the city's rapid growth.  The Dilworth neighborhood was picked because of its proximity to Uptown, South End, and the light rail.  The site is approximately .3 miles away from the Carson Blvd rail light station.  Radius Dilworth is a different type of development, most of Dilworth's single-family homes.  This development will be one of the first dense housing projects in Dilworth, and the tallest building in the neighborhood.   However, there are other nearby developments that are also transforming the neighborhood such as the medical innovation district called The Pearl will be about less than a mile away and the Village on Morehead across Euclid has 200 senior apartments.

See also
 Dilworth
 List of tallest buildings in Charlotte, North Carolina

References

Buildings and structures in Charlotte, North Carolina